Horipsestis is a genus of moths belonging to the subfamily Thyatirinae of the Drepanidae.

Species
Horipsestis aenea (Wileman, 1911)
Horipsestis angusta Yoshimoto, 1996
Horipsestis kisvaczak Laszlo, G.Ronkay, L.Ronkay & Witt, 2007
Horipsestis minutus (Forbes, 1936)
Horipsestis mushana (Matsumura, 1931)

References

 , 1933, Insecta Matsumurana 7: 193.
 , 2007, Esperiana Buchreihe zur Entomologie Band 13: 1–683 

Thyatirinae
Drepanidae genera